The 31st Legislative Assembly of Ontario was in session from June 9, 1977, until February 2, 1981, just prior to the 1981 general election. The Ontario Progressive Conservative Party led by Bill Davis formed a second consecutive minority government.

Russell Daniel Rowe served as speaker for the assembly until October 17, 1977. John Edward Stokes succeeded Rowe as speaker.

Notes

References 
Members in Parliament 31

Terms of the Legislative Assembly of Ontario
1977 establishments in Ontario
1981 disestablishments in Ontario